Irreversi is a 2010 dramatic film directed by Michael Gleissner and shot in Hong Kong as the English language version of Gleissner's Mandarin-language film Hui lu, which he filmed and directed at the same time in the same locations but with an entirely different cast.  The title refers to how a situation can reverse and turn against the original perpetrator.

Production 
Both Irreversi and Hui lu were self-financed by Gleissner, and filming of both began in Hong Kong in March 2006.  The film duo marked being Gleissner's directorial debut, as well as being the first time identical films were produced simultaneously in both English and Mandarin, with the two otherwise identical versions having two separate sets of cast and crew.  The only cast that was common to both films were Vietnamese supermodel Bebe Pham and Geissner himself using the pseudonym of Ken Arden.  Gleissner directed both films and produced the English version.  Elliot Tong produced the Chinese version, which was itself released in Hong Kong in 2007 and screened in Beijing, Shanghai, Guangzhou, Shenzhen and Chengdu in 2009.

Synopsis 
Adam, a young entrepreneur, has sold his technology company.  The money allows him and his new wife Lynda to enjoy a life of luxury, but their marriage becomes unstable when Lynda begins to suspect that Adam's newly acquired fortune is related to the recent death of her brother.

Cast

Irreversi 
 Mei Melancon as Lynda
 Ian Bohen as Adam
 Estella Warren as Kat
 Kenny Doughty as David
 Michael Gleissner as Charlie (as Ken Arden)
 Caroline Carver as Terry
 Bebe Pham as Show Model
 Kersten Hui as Taxidermy Boss
 Jo Wee as Ling
 Christian Mills as Simon
 Howard Cheung as John

Hui lu 

 Margaret Wang as Lynda Wei
 Hawick Lau as Adam Liu
 Sasha Hou as Kat Chen
 Hao Qin as David Du
 Michael Gleissner as Charlie (as Ken Arden)
 Susanna Fung as Terry
 Bebe Pham as Show Model
 Kersten Hui as Taxidermy Boss
 Yao Hsiao as Ling
 Elliot Tong as Simon Chu
 Philip Ng as John Wei
 Jeremiah Sird as Gao Fei

Recognition

Awards and nominations 
In 2008 Ireversi – Hiu lu Won the Award of Merit at the 6th Annual Accolade Competition.

References

External links 
 Irreversi 
 Hui lu 
 
 
 
 Production's Ireversi website
 Production's Hui lu website
 Title song "The Stuff That I'm Made Of" by Muller and Patton on iTunes

2010 films
2007 drama films
2007 films
Films set in Hong Kong
2010 drama films